Walter Frederic "Mike" Kelly (January 13, 1874 – March 1, 1961) was an American football player, coach of football, basketball, and baseball, and physician.  He served as the head football coach at University of Texas at Austin in 1897 and at Butler University from 1899 to 1903, compiling a career college football record of 10–14.  Kelly was also the head basketball coach at Butler from 1899 to 1903, tallying a mark of 6–8, and was the school's head baseball coach from 1901 to 1905 and again in 1908, amassing a record of 7–21–1.  Before his tenure at Butler, Kelly served as an assistant coach to David Farragut Edwards at Texas in 1898.

While coaching at Butler, Kelly pursued a medical degree at Indiana Medical College, from which he graduated in 1906.  He worked as a physician in Marion County, Indiana for more than 54 years before his death on March 1, 1961, at his home in Indianapolis.

Head coaching record

Football

References

External links
 

1874 births
1961 deaths
19th-century players of American football
20th-century American physicians
Basketball coaches from Massachusetts
Butler Bulldogs baseball coaches
Butler Bulldogs football coaches
Butler Bulldogs men's basketball coaches
Dartmouth Big Green football players
Texas Longhorns football coaches
Sportspeople from Haverhill, Massachusetts
People from Bradford, Massachusetts
Players of American football from Massachusetts
Physicians from Indiana